Don Chisciotte alle nozze di Gamace (Don Quixote at Camacho's Wedding), composed by Antonio Salieri, is an Italian-language opera. The libretto presents the opera as in one act (five scenes), and the musical score includes a mid-point division, both score, and libretto originally denoted the work a divertimento treatrale. The work is loosely adapted from chapters 19 and 21 of Part II of the novel Don Quixote by Miguel de Cervantes. The work was a hybrid opera buffa and ballet, with choreography by Jean-Georges Noverre.

This opera was the third of Salieri's to be publicly performed, as well as his third collaboration with Boccherini. This was Salieri's fourth complete opera.

Performance history
Salieri, wrote Don Chisciotte in Vienna in 1770, according to his first biographer Mosel it may have been the second or third work he wrote with Boccherini. It received its first performance during Carnival season the next year at the Kärntnertortheater in Vienna, the libretto is dated 1770, but it was most likely on performed on 6 January 1771.
It is believed the work was not revived until 8 October 2016 at the Festival Internacional Cervantino de Guanajuato México where it was performed in a concert performance by Les Nouveaux Caractères under the direction of Sébastien d'Hérin.

Roles

Synopsis
Time: the 17th century
Place: rural Spain, the wedding near the farmhouse of Gamace.

Summary:
Don Quoxite and Sancho Panza arrive at the wedding of Comacho (Gamace) and participate in dances and verbal intrigues as the wedding feast is prepared.

Structure, genre, critical reception

The work combines dances, dance suites for ballet with arias, short songs, recitatives, and ensembles in an attempt to create a new artistic hybrid between Goldonian opera buffa and French ballet.  The work was scored for strings, pairs of oboes, bassoons, and horns.  The orchestration was likely dictated by the post-performance needs for dancing at the theater's carnival ball.

The work did not please and was apparently never revived in Vienna or elsewhere in Salieri's lifetime.

Salieri reused the opening theme of the overture later in 1795 for his revision and completion of the opera Il mondo alla rovescia where it also serves as the main theme of the overture.

Recordings

Notes

References
 Rudolph Angermüller, Antonio Salieri, 3 Vol. (Munich 1971–74)
 Volkmar Braunbehrens, Maligned Master – the Real Story of Antonio Salieri, transl. Eveline L. Kanes (New York 1992)
 V. Della Croce/F. Blanchetti, Il caso Salieri (Turin 1994)
 , Über das Leben und die Werke des Anton Salieri (Vienna 1827; reprinted Bad Honnef 1999, edited with notes by Rudolph Angermüller)
 John A. Rice, Antonio Salieri and Viennese Opera (Chicago 1998), 
 Alexander Wheelock Thayer, Salieri: Rival of Mozart (Kansas City 1989)

External links
 Libretto
 Libretto
 Fullscore manuscript

Operas by Antonio Salieri
Italian-language operas
1770 operas
Operas
Pastoral operas
Opera world premieres at the Burgtheater
Operas based on Don Quixote